Crotched Mountain Rehabilitation Center is located in Greenfield, New Hampshire, United States. It began as a rehabilitation center for children with polio and over the years has evolved into one of New Hampshire's largest human services organizations, serving day and residential students with disabilities at Crotched Mountain School, young children with autism in its Ready Set Connect school-readiness programs, and adults with unique needs through Crotched Mountain Community Care.

History
The Crotched Mountain Rehabilitation Center began operation in 1953. It was established by Harry Gregg of Nashua, the father of New Hampshire governor Hugh Gregg and grandfather of future U.S. senator Judd Gregg. The creation of the Crotched Mountain Rehabilitation Center was the culmination of a prolonged effort undertaken by Harry Gregg and others to build a center for rehabilitation for children.

Harry Gregg met Ezra A. Jones around 1920, MD, who was the first orthopedic specialist in New Hampshire through the clinic established in Nashua. Orthopedics as a medical discipline arose from the challenge of dealing with unprecedented numbers of wounds and disabilities caused by the Great War. Jones created clinics in the major cities of New Hampshire. 

In 1936 Harry Gregg and Ezra Jones were instrumental in the founding of the New Hampshire Society for Crippled Children. Funded primarily by the Easter Seals drive, the Society publicized the need for more extensive treatment programs for disabled people, lobbied for favorable legislation and carried on the clinics around the state. The Society made small grants to support the medical and rehabilitation needs of children and adults.

Several years after the establishment of the Society, Dr. Jones confided to Harry Gregg that his greatest wish was that New Hampshire would have a hospital where the patients with crippling diseases could come for sustained treatment and therapy under the most up-to-date conditions. This vision melded with one of Gregg's to build a "crippled children's camp" in Greenfield, New Hampshire. Gregg chose Greenfield because he had founded a summer camp for poor children from Nashua on the north shore of Sunset Lake, a small water body in Greenfield. Harry's sons had helped with the construction and operation of the camp. The camp was called the Nashua Fresh Air camp, and it eventually served more than 350 children each summer in two-week sessions before it closed in the 1970s. Through his experience with the camp Harry had learned of a large parcel of level land on a shoulder of Crotched Mountain, the Russell Dairy Farm. In the fall of 1942, the Society for Crippled Children authorized an expenditure of up to $7,500 to purchase the land at Crotched Mountain for the site of a "crippled children's camp". A little more than two months later, Gregg reported to the Society's Executive Committee that he had completed the purchase using funds from two bequests.

While referred to as a camp, the dream had evolved to something far grander. A "dream picture" created by a Boston architect of what might be achieved that was presented to the 1944 annual meeting included not only medical, therapeutic and educational facilities, but also a working farm with a modern barn. All buildings would be connected by walks and ramps for residents using wheelchairs, crutches, and braces. The community included stores where people worked, residences where they lived and even housed two churches. (This painting of the Crotched Mountain community still exists and hangs in the president's office.)

In 1944 Gregg described his plan to make this vision a reality to the Society Executive Committee. He announced that a friend was willing to establish a foundation and contribute $350,000 to it. Gregg recommended a fundraising goal of $250,000 for "a camp and fireproof Convalescent Hospital." In addition, an endowment of $1 million should be raised to provide operating income.

The choice of the location of the new rehabilitation center in remote and rural Greenfield was not without some controversy. Many thought it should be located in one of the larger cities in the state, Manchester or Nashua. Gregg consulted with experts in the field including Dr. Howard A. Rusk, who was the chair of physical rehabilitation medicine established at the New York University Medical Center. Rusk and other experts agreed that an institution serving the entire state would benefit from an independent location not affiliated with any hospital. The Society affirmed its choice. Fundraising continued throughout the late 1940s and early 1950s to raise the funds needed for the construction of the campus and the endowment. Gregg was able to generate publicity for his campaign in state, regional and national newspapers which supported the fundraising. Construction began in 1950 and the center opened in 1953.

The facility originally treated people for polio, cerebral palsy, spina bifida and other physical and neurological disabilities. A center for adult rehabilitation opened in 1961, and a rehabilitation center for adults with brain injuries in 1986. It operated a school for the deaf from 1955 to the early 1970s.

The complex today provides service to over 2,000 children and adults. Crotched Mountain has more than 900 employees and an annual budget of more than $42 million.

In 2004, it unveiled the first wheelchair-accessible treehouse in New Hampshire.

In 2007, an employee, Linda Bevins, was accused of embezzling $1.3 million from the Crotched Mountain Foundation. Bevins is accused of creating and paying fictitious employees, and then channeling the money to herself. The theft was discovered during an internal balancing of accounts, when an irregularity was noticed. A federal indictment was handed down in March 2008.

A civil suit filed by the Foundation has resulted in a judgment of more than a million dollars against Bevins and her daughter Holly Sears.

In November 2022, Seven Hills Foundation announced its affiliation with Crotched Mountain. The school is operated as part of Seven Hills New Hampshire.

References

External links 
Crotched Mountain Rehabilitation Center
PDF - business school analysis of Crotched Mountain Rehabilitation Center

Hospital buildings completed in 1953
Buildings and structures in Hillsborough County, New Hampshire
Hospitals in Hillsborough County, New Hampshire
Greenfield, New Hampshire